

The Montana Coyote is an American single-engined two-seat STOL aircraft designed for home building by Montana Coyote Inc. of Helena, Montana.

Design and development
The Coyote is a high-wing strut-braced monoplane first flown in early 1991 and sold as kit for home building without an engine. With a steel tube fuselage and wooden wings it is designed to take an engine between 100 and 200 hp (74 to 149 kW) as long as it weighs less than 350 lb (159 kg). It has a fixed tailwheel type landing gear with a cabin for a pilot and passenger side-by-side, it is designed to land and take-off within 350 ft (107 m).

Specifications

References

Notes

Bibliography

 

1990s United States civil utility aircraft
Homebuilt aircraft